Wayport is an unincorporated community in Washington Township, Monroe County, in the U.S. state of Indiana.

History
Wayport was platted in 1851. In its heyday, the town had a post office, a blacksmith shop, and a general store. The post office operated from 1877 to 1879.

Construction on I-69 impacted several gas stations and businesses in Wayport. Most were shut down by the end of 2018.

Geography

References

Unincorporated communities in Monroe County, Indiana
Unincorporated communities in Indiana
Bloomington, Indiana